Samantha is a 1991 American film starring actress Martha Plimpton. Though at the time Plimpton was already a film actress for nearly ten years, this was the first vehicle in which she was the star. The film co-starred Dermot Mulroney, Hector Elizondo, Mary Kay Place and Ione Skye. It was a commercial failure, with mixed critical reviews.

The film was released in the fall and promoted as a romance blockbuster. A soundtrack/score album was released in anticipation of success that never came. The film featured cameo appearances by Robert Picardo (who would later find fame as The Doctor on Star Trek: Voyager) and Maryedith Burnell. Burnell had previously played the character of Helen Buckman, mother to Julie Buckman in the television version of the film Parenthood; in the film version, Julie was played by Martha Plimpton.

Plot 

Samantha is a hugely talented violinist who discovers on her 21st birthday that she was left on the steps of her parents, Marilyn and Walter's home and subsequently adopted.

She goes into a panic, asserting that everything she has believed herself to be is a lie.  She abandons music just before her senior university recital.  She moves in with childhood friend Henry.  As she searches for her true identity she becomes oblivious to the inconvenience and suffering her search is causing the people she loves.

Ultimately she locates her birth parents, Neil and Charlotte Otto, who are emotionally cold towards her but, who are professional concert musicians, a harpist and a flautist.  She realizes that her gift of music came from within, but that despite no blood-connection, her family is truly her own.

Cast
Martha Plimpton as Samantha
Mary Kay Place as Marilyn
Hector Elizondo as Walter
Dermot Mulroney as Henry
Maryedith Burrell as Charlotte Otto
Robert Picardo as Neil Otto
Ione Skye as Elaine

Reception

External links 

1991 films
1991 comedy films
Films about adoption
American comedy films
American independent films
Films shot in California
Films scored by Joel McNeely
1990s English-language films
1990s American films